Yang Ming-tse (born 29 January 1997) is a Taiwanese badminton player.

Achievements

BWF International Challenge/Series (6 titles, 4 runners-up) 
Men's doubles

Mixed doubles

  BWF International Challenge tournament
  BWF International Series tournament
  BWF Future Series tournament

References

External links 
 

1997 births
Living people
Taiwanese male badminton players